The 1947 NCAA baseball tournament was the first NCAA-sanctioned baseball tournament that determined a national champion.  The tournament was held as the conclusion of the 1947 NCAA baseball season, beginning on June 20.  The  College World Series was played at Hyames Field on the campus of Western Michigan University in Kalamazoo, Michigan from June 27 to June 28.  The first tournament's champion was California, coached by Clint Evans.

Tournament
The tournament was divided into two regional brackets, the Eastern playoff and the Western playoff.  Each region played a single elimination bracket, with the champion advancing to the College World Series.

Field
The tournament field was determined by regional committees, some of whom held playoffs, while others selected specific conference champions, and still others simply selected their representatives.  The eight teams were divided among the East and West brackets.

Eastern playoff
At Yale Field, New Haven, Connecticut

Western playoff
At Denver, Colorado

College World Series

Participants

Results
The first College World Series was a best of three series.

Bracket

Game results

Notable players
 California: Jackie Jensen
 Yale: Frank Quinn, George Bush, Bill Howe

Tournament notes
Future President of the United States George H. W. Bush was Yale's captain and appeared in the 1947 and 1948 College World Series. (Bush was actually waiting on-deck when Cal recorded the final out in the second game of the 1947 series.)

References

Tournament
NCAA Division I Baseball Championship
NCAA baseball tournament
NCAA baseball tournament
NCAA baseball tournament
NCAA baseball tournament
1940s in Denver
History of New Haven, Connecticut
Baseball competitions in Michigan
Baseball competitions in Denver
Sports competitions in Kalamazoo, Michigan
Sports competitions in New Haven, Connecticut